Tlemcen is the second-largest city in northwestern Algeria after Oran and is the capital of Tlemcen Province. The city has developed leather, carpet, and textile industries, which it exports through the port of Rachgoun. It had a population of 140,158 during the 2008 census.

Former capital of the central Maghreb, the city is a mix of Berber, Arab, Hispano-Moorish, Ottoman, and Western influences. From this mosaic of influences, the city derives the title of capital of Andalusian art in Algeria. According to the author Dominique Mataillet, various titles are attributed to the city including "the pearl of the Maghreb", "the African Granada" and "the Medina of the West".

Etymology 
The name Tlemcen (Tilimsān) was given by the Zayyanid King Yaghmurasen Ibn Zyan. One possible etymology is that it comes from a Berber word tilmas, meaning "spring, water-hole", or from the combination of the Berber words tala ("fountain"), the preposition m-, and sān ("two"), thus meaning "two fountains". Another proposed etymology is from the Zanata words talam ("junction") and sān ("two"), referring to the town's geographic position which links the desert regions to the south with the mountainous regions to the north.

History

Prehistory 
The areas surrounding Tlemcen were inhabited during the Neolithic period, as evidenced by the discovery of polished axes in the caves of Boudghene by Gustave-Marie Bleicher in 1875.

There are three important prehistoric sites in the region: lake Karar, located one kilometer south of Remchi; the rock shelters of Mouilah, 5 km north of Maghnia; and the deposit called "d'Ouzidan", 2 km west of Aïn El Hout. The shelters found at the Mouilah and Boudghene sites present favorable habitat conditions for prehistoric man, who settled in the area for a long time.

Antiquity
In AD 17, Tacfarinas led the Gaetuli to revolt against the Romans.

Tlemcen became a military outpost of Ancient Rome in the 2nd century CE under the name of Pomaria. It was then an important city in the North Africa see of the Roman Catholic Church, where it was the center of a diocese. Its bishop, Victor, was a prominent representative at the Council of Carthage (411), and its bishop Honoratus was exiled in 484 by the Vandal king Huneric for denying Arianism.

It was a center of a large Christian population for many centuries after the city's Arab conquest in 708 AD.

Early Islamic period 
In the later eighth century and the ninth century, the city became a Kingdom of Banu Ifran with a Sufri Kharijite orientation. These same Berber Kharijis also began to develop various small Saharan oases and to link them into regular trans-Saharan caravan routes terminating at Tlemcen, beginning a process that would determine Tlemcen's historical role for almost all of the next millennium. In the late 8th century a settlement named Agadir existed on the site of former Roman Pomaria. Idris I founded a congregational mosque here, the Great Mosque of Agadir, circa 790 (no longer extant).

In 1081 or 1082 the Almoravid leader Yusuf ibn Tashfin founded the city of Tagrart ("encampment" in Berber language), just west of Agadir. The fusion of the two settlements of Tagrart and Agadir over time became what is now Tlemcen. At the same time as he founded Tagrart, Ibn Tashfin founded its congregational mosque, known today as the Great Mosque of Tlemcen, which was expanded in 1126 by his son and successor 'Ali Ibn Yusuf. He built a governor's residence next to it, known after as the Qasr al-Qadim ("Old Palace").

Control of the region passed from the Almoravids to the Almohad Caliphate in the mid-twelfth century. After its conquest, the Almohad ruler 'Abd al-Mu'min surrounded the city with a wall in 1145 and built a new citadel. However, in the early thirteenth century, 'Abdallah ibn Ghaniya attempted to restore Almoravid control of the Maghreb. In about 1209, the region around Tlemcen was devastated by retreating Almoravid forces, not long before their final defeat by the Almohads at the Battle of Jebel Nafusa in 1210. Despite the destruction of Tlemcen's already-feeble agricultural base, Tlemcen rose to prominence as a major trading and administrative center in the region under the ensuing reign of the Almohads.

Zayyanid period

After the end of Almohad rule in the 1230s, Tlemcen became the capital of one of the three successor states, the Zayyanid Kingdom of Tlemcen (1236–1554). The Zayyanid ruler Yaghmurasen Ibn Zyan succeeded in merging Agadir and Tagrart into a single city and gave it the name Tlemcen. Initially, Yagmurasen resided in the Qasr al-Qadim but he soon moved the seat of power to a new citadel, the Mechouar, towards the mid 13th century. The city was thereafter ruled for centuries by successive Zayyanid sultans. During this era it was one of the most important economic and cultural centers in the region, alongside other political capitals like Fes, Tunis, and Granada. During the Middle Ages, Tlemcen not only served as a trading city connecting the "coastal" route across the Maghreb with the trans-Saharan caravan routes, but also housed a European trading center, or funduk which connected African and European merchants. African gold arrived in Tlemcen from south of the Sahara through Sijilmasa or Taghaza and entered European hands. Consequently, Tlemcen was partially integrated into the European financial system. For example, Genoese bills of exchange circulated there, at least among merchants not subject to (or not deterred by) religious prohibitions.

At the peak of its success in the first half of the fourteenth century, Tlemcen was a city of perhaps 40,000 inhabitants. It housed several well-known madrasas and numerous wealthy religious foundations, and became the principal intellectual center of the central Maghreb. The Zayyanids were the first to sponsor of the construction of madrasas in this part of the Maghreb, and among the most famous in Tlemcen was the Tashfiniya Madrasa founded by Abu Tashfin I (r. 1318–1337). At the souq around the Great Mosque, merchants sold woolen fabrics and rugs from the East, slaves and gold from across the Sahara, local earthenware and leather goods, and a variety of Mediterranean maritime goods "redirected" to Tlemcen by corsairs—in addition to imported European goods available at the funduk. Merchant houses based in Tlemcen, such as the al-Makkari, maintained regular branch offices in Mali and the Sudan.

Later in the fourteenth century, the city twice fell under the rule of the Marinid sultan, Abu al-Hasan Ali (1337–1348) and his son Abu 'Inan. Both times the Marinids found that they were unable to hold the region against local resistance. Nevertheless, these episodes appear to have marked the beginning of the end. Over the following two centuries, Zayyanid Tlemcen was intermittently a vassal of Ifriqiya (then governed by the Hafsid dynasty), Maghrib al-Aqsa (then governed by the Marinid dynasty), or Aragon. When the Spanish took the city of Oran from the Zayyanids in 1509, continuous pressure from the Berbers prompted the Spanish to attempt a counterattack against Tlemcen in 1543, which the papacy deemed a crusade. The Spanish failed to take the city in the first attack, although the strategic vulnerability of Tlemcen caused the kingdom's weight to shift toward the safer and more heavily fortified corsair base at Algiers.

The ruler of Tlemcen is reported to have been advised by a Jewish viceroy named Abraham, who, in the time of the Inquisition of Torquemada, opened the gates of Tlemcen to Jewish and Muslim refugees fleeing Spain. Abraham is said to have supported them with his own money and with the tolerance of the king of Tlemcen.

Later years

In 1551, Tlemcen came under Ottoman rule after the Campaign of Tlemcen. Tlemcen and the Algerian provinces regained effective independence in their own affairs in 1671, although Tlemcen was no longer a government seat as before. The Spanish were evicted from Oran in 1792, but thirty years later, they were replaced by the French, who seized Algiers. A French fleet bombarded Algiers in 1830, at which point the dey capitulated to French colonial rule; a broad coalition of natives continued to resist, coordinated loosely at Tlemcen.

Tlemcen was a vacation spot and retreat for French settlers in Algeria, who found it far more temperate than Oran or Algiers. The city adapted and became more cosmopolitan, with a unique outlook on art and culture, and its architecture and urban life evolved to accommodate this new sense. In the independence movements of the mid-twentieth century, it was relatively quiet, reflecting the city's sense of aloofness from the turbulence of Algiers. In 1943 Tlemcen was little more than a railway halt. On January 13 a British and American train patrol engaged in a skirmish with the retreating troops of the Afrika Korps. As the US Army marched eastwards from its Moroccan landing grounds, the British 8th Army drove west, forcing the Germans into an evacuation pocket at Tunis. Between 1942–1943, before embarking for Italy, the US Army Medical Corps established two fixed hospitals at Tlemcen: 9th Evacuation (as station), 12–26 December 1942. Seven hundred and fifty beds and 32d Station, 28 February – 28 November 1943, 500 beds.

The most important place for pilgrimage of all religions into Tlemcen was the Jewish cemetery on the outskirts of town. Up to 10,000 people worldwide made the journey to the site. Nonetheless, despite religious freedoms, their community had never numbered more than 5,000–6,000 in the 20th century, and discriminatory laws of had been in force since 1881. After Algerian independence in 1962, most of the small Jewish population evacuated to metropolitan France. The Berber tribes historically professed Judaism. During the colonial period they served in the French Army. French Jews of the Alliance Israélite Universelle paid for a local Jewish school, which closed in 1934, perhaps owing to the rise of Fascism. In 2009 Jordanian sources reported that the Algerian government intended to restore the damaged Jewish tombs at the historic cemetery.

Climate
Tlemcen has a hot-summer Mediterranean climate (Köppen climate classification Csa).

Demographics 

The population of Tlemcen is divided between Hadars (the middle class, descended from the Moors) and Kouloughlis (descendants of Turks and Berber women).

Culture 
Its centuries of rich history and culture have made the city a center of a unique blend of music and art. Its textiles and handcrafts, its elegant blend of Berber and Andalusi cultures, and its cool climate in the mountains have made it an important center of tourism in Algeria. It is home to a beautiful tomb—that of Sidi Boumédiène, whose tomb adjoins a mosque. The Great Mosque of Tlemcen was completed in 1136 and is said to be the most remarkable remaining example of Almoravid architecture.

Media

Newspapers 
Le Petit Tlemcenien, French language weekly (1882)

Transport 

It is served by the international Zenata – Messali El Hadj Airport.

Notable people
 Ibn Abī Ḥajalah (1325–1375), poet and writer
 Ahmed Mohammed al-Maqqari (1591–1632), historian
 Eugénie Buffet (1866–1934), French singer
 Larbi Bensari (1867–1964), musician
 Henri Dickson (1872–1938), French singer
 Cheikha Tetma (1891–1962), musician
 Messali Hadj (1898–1974), nationalist politician
 Hocine Benachenhou (1898–1979), political revolutionary
 Abdelhalim Hemche (1906–1979), painter
 Abdelhamid Benachenhou (1907–1976), historian
 Paul Bénichou (1908–2001), French writer and historian
 Abdelkrim Dali (1914–1978), musician
 Mohammed Dib (1920–2003), writer
 Benaouda Benzerdjeb (1921–1956), physician and martyr
 Bachir Yellès (1921–2022), painter
 Djilali Sari (born 1928), sociologist and historian
 Abdelmadjid Meziane (1929–2001), scholar and theologian
 Kamel Malti (born 1929), musicologist 
 Choukri Mesli (born 1931), painter
 Marie-Claude Gay (born 1942), French novelist
 Mourad Medelci (1943–2019), politician
 Ahmed Benhelli (born 1940), diplomat
 Rachid Baba Ahmed (1946–1995), singer and composer
 Sami Naïr (born 1946), political philosopher
 Emile Malet (born 1947), French journalist and writer
 Latifa Ben Mansour (born 1950), writer
 Patrick Bruel (born 1959), French actor and singer
 Mohamed Zaoui (born 1960), boxer
 Kherris Kheireddine (born 1973), international footballer
 Anwar Boudjakdji (born 1976), international footballer
 Kamel Habri (born 1976), international footballer
 Dahlab Ali (born 1976), international footballer

International relations

Twin towns — sister cities 
Tlemcen is twinned with:

See also 
 WA Tlemcen
 Tlemcen National Park
 El-Ourit Waterfalls

References

External links 

 Tlemcen, non official website
 Abou Bakr Belkaid University of Tlemcen
 Free/Open Source Community of Tlemcen
 Unofficial portrait of this city

 Tlemcen in the region Oran, non official website

 
2nd-century establishments in the Roman Empire
Populated places in Tlemcen Province
Populated places established in the 2nd century
Historic Jewish communities
Province seats of Algeria
Roman towns and cities in Algeria
Algeria geography articles needing translation from French Wikipedia